Rebilus is a genus of spiders in the family Trachycosmidae. It was first described in 1880 by Simon. , it contains 17 Australian species.

Species
Rebilus comprises the following species:
Rebilus bilpin Platnick, 2002
Rebilus binnaburra Platnick, 2002
Rebilus brooklana Platnick, 2002
Rebilus bulburin Platnick, 2002
Rebilus bunya Platnick, 2002
Rebilus crediton Platnick, 2002
Rebilus glorious Platnick, 2002
Rebilus grayi Platnick, 2002
Rebilus griswoldi Platnick, 2002
Rebilus kaputar Platnick, 2002
Rebilus lamington Platnick, 2002
Rebilus lugubris (L. Koch, 1875) 
Rebilus maleny Platnick, 2002
Rebilus monteithi Platnick, 2002
Rebilus morton Platnick, 2002 
Rebilus tribulation Platnick, 2002 
Rebilus wisharti Platnick, 2002

References

Trochanteriidae
Araneomorphae genera
Spiders of Australia